The 2021–22 season is Forest Green Rovers' 133rd year in their history and fifth consecutive season in League Two. Along with the league, the club will also compete in the FA Cup, the EFL Cup and the EFL Trophy. The season covers the period from 1 July 2021 to 30 June 2022.

During pre-season, FGR announced Rob Edwards as their Head Coach.

Pre-season friendlies
FGR announced they will have friendlies against Melksham Town, Yate Town, Cardiff City, Leamington, Swansea City and Yeovil Town as part of their pre-season preparations.

Competitions

League Two

League table

Results summary

Results by matchday

Matches
FGR's fixtures were released on 24 June 2021.

FA Cup

Rovers were drawn away to Corinthian Casuals or St Albans City in the first round.

EFL Cup

Forest Green were drawn at home to Bristol City in the first round and away to Brentford in the second round.

EFL Trophy

Transfers

Transfers in

Loans in

Loans out

Transfers out

Statistics

Appearances and goals

Last updated 7 May 2022.

|-
! colspan=14 style=background:#dcdcdc; text-align:center| Goalkeepers

|-

! colspan=14 style=background:#dcdcdc; text-align:center| Defenders

|-

! colspan=14 style=background:#dcdcdc; text-align:center| Midfielders

|-

! colspan=14 style=background:#dcdcdc; text-align:center| Forwards

|}

Top scorers
Includes all competitive matches. The list is sorted by squad number when total goals are equal.

Last updated 7 May 2022.

Cleansheets
Includes all competitive matches. The list is sorted by squad number when total cleansheets are equal.

Last updated 7 May 2022.

Disciplinary record
Includes all competitive matches.

Last updated 7 May 2022.

References

Forest Green Rovers
Forest Green Rovers F.C. seasons